Leonardo Lins de Oliveira  or simply  Leo Oliveira  (born 28 May 1980) is a Brazilian defender who plays for Ipatinga.

See also
Football in Brazil

References

 CBF 
 Profile at Sambafoot

1980 births
Living people
Brazilian footballers
Ipatinga Futebol Clube players
Criciúma Esporte Clube players
Association football defenders